P. K. Narayana Panicker (15 August 1930 – 29 February 2012)  was the President and General Secretary of the Nair Service Society (NSS), the social service organization established in 1914. He is the second-longest-serving  general secretary of the organization (after founder Mannath Padmanabhan), who has served 28 years in the post.  He was an advocate by profession, who came to the front row  of the organization in 1977 as its treasurer and later became General secretary in 1984.

Biography
Narayana Panicker was born on 27 August 1930 as the first son and third child of the seven kids of Vazhappally Padinjarubhagam Pichamathil A. N. Velu Pillai and Lakshmikutty Amma. He completed his education at St.Teresa's Higher Secondary School, Changanassery, St. Berchmans College, Changanassery and Government Law College, Ernakulam. He has worked both as a teacher and as an advocate during the course of his career.

He has also worked as the Chairman of Changanassery Municipality, member of Kerala University Senet, member of M.G. University Syndicate, member of Guruvayoor Devaswom and also as the president of Changanassery Lions Club. In 1977, he was elected as the treasurer of Nair Service Society. On New Year's Day in 1984, he became the General Secretary of NSS, succeeding Kidangoor Gopalakrishna Pillai. He continued in office until 2011, when he was succeeded by his assistant secretary G. Sukumaran Nair. He is the second-longest served General Secretary of N.S.S. He was elected as the President of N.S.S. in 2011.

Panicker died on 29 February 2012 at his home due to age-related complications. He was aged 81 at the time of his death. His health had been deteriorating for a long time. He was also the serving President of Nair Service Society when he died, having elected less than a year ago. His dead body was kept for public view in the N.S.S. headquarters in Perunna and was cremated with full state honours at his home premises. He is survived by three sons - Satheesh Kumar, Jagadeesh Kumar and Ranjith Kumar. His wife Savithri Amma predeceased him in 2006.

Awards
Sreshta Purusha Award 2009

References

External links
http://www.nss.org.in/

People from Changanassery
1930 births
2012 deaths
Nair
Educators from Kerala
20th-century Indian educational theorists
Vazhappally